Oberwald railway station is a railway station serving the village of Oberwald, in the Canton of Valais, Switzerland.  The station is close to the western portal of the Furka Base Tunnel, on the metre gauge Furka Oberalp Bahn (FO), which connects Brig in Valais, via the base tunnel and Andermatt in Uri, with Göschenen, Uri, and Disentis/Mustér, Graubünden.  Since , the FO has been owned and operated by the Matterhorn Gotthard Bahn (MGB), following a merger between the FO and the Brig-Visp-Zermatt railway (BVZ).

At ceremony held on 12 August 2010, Oberwald station also became a station on the Furka Steam Railway (DFB), a heritage railway operating in summer over the FO section that was replaced by the Furka Base Tunnel in 1982.  The portion of the DFB between Oberwald and Gletsch was formally reopened that day, following the driving of a gold spike at a ceremony on 18 June 2010 to mark the physical reconnection of that portion of the line.  Scheduled DFB services commenced on 13 August 2010.

Services
The following services stop at Oberwald:

 DFB heritage train services between Oberwald and Realp via the traditional mountain route operate only between June and October.

The long-distance Glacier Express passes through Oberwald without stopping; the Glacier Express ceased stopping at Oberwald in late 2014. Construction of the proposed Grimsel Tunnel would provide a fourth metre gauge railway link northwards under the Grimsel Pass towards Meiringen railway station.

See also

Glacier Express
Car shuttle train
Matterhorn Gotthard Bahn
Furka Base Tunnel
Furka Oberalp Bahn
Furka Steam Railway

References

Notes

Further reading

External links
 
 
 Matterhorn Gotthard Bahn
 Furka Steam Railway 
 Official timetable of Switzerland

Matterhorn Gotthard Bahn stations
Railway stations in the canton of Valais
Railway stations in Switzerland opened in 1914